Showbread Is Showdead is the eleventh and final studio album from Showbread. They released the album on January 8, 2016.

Critical reception
{{Album ratings
| rev1 = HM Magazine
| rev1Score = 
| rev2 = Jesus Freak Hideout
| rev2Score = 
}}

Taylor Weston, allotting the album four and a half stars by HM Magazine, recognizes, "Showbread Is Showdead, tips a courteous hat towards the band’s history, before injecting a fresh dose of adrenaline and entering into uncharted territory. Featuring members old, current and new, it’s more than a worthy effort." Awarding the album five stars at Jesus Freak Hideout, Scott Fryberger writes, "Showbread Is Showdead'' is a stellar way to end a bizarre, yet amazing, career in the music industry". Christopher Smith, rating the album four stars from Jesus Freak Hideout, states, "Showbread may be showdead after 2016, but their raw rock will kill forever and ever." Giving the album four and a half stars for Jesus Freak Hideout, describes, "Showbread's final hurrah is one you'll definitely want to hear."

Track listing

References

2016 albums
Showbread (band) albums
Facedown Records albums